The Nigeria women's national handball team is the national team of Nigeria. It takes part in international handball competitions. 

At the 1992 Olympics the team finished 8th.

Results

Summer Olympics
1992 – 8th

African Championship
1976 – 6th
1979 – 6th
1981 – 3rd
1983 – 2nd
1985 – 4th
1991 – 1st
1992 – 4th
1994 – 5th
2021 – 8th

References

External links
IHF profile

Handball
Women's national handball teams
National team